The following is the discography of American musician Babyface.

Albums

Studio albums

Live albums

Remix albums

Compilation albums

Singles

Other appearances

Album appearances

Soundtrack appearances

Select songwriting and production credits

Notes

References

Discographies of American artists
Contemporary R&B discographies
Discography
Production discographies